Peter Coad (born December 30, 1953) is a software entrepreneur and author of books on programming. He is notable for his role in defining what have come to be known as the UML colors, a color-coded notation chiefly useful for adding breadth and depth to a design, using four major archetypes.

Biography 
 
Coad received a Bachelor of Science with Honors in Electrical Engineering from OSU (Stillwater) in 1977 and a Master of Science in Computer Science from USC in 1981.

In 1988, Peter Coad founded Object International, a software consulting firm where he served as president.

From 1989 through the 1990s, Coad co-authored six books on the analysis, design, and programming of object-oriented software. During this time Coad became famous through his work on the Coad/Yourdon method for Object-oriented analysis (OOA) which he had developed together with Edward Yourdon. He is considered a supporter of the lightweight methodology called Feature Driven Development (FDD), which was developed primarily by co-author Jeff De Luca.

In 1999, Coad was co-founder of the software company TogetherSoft, where he served as chairman, chief executive officer, and president.

From about 2000 to 2004 Coad was editor-in-chief of the Coad Series of books from Prentice Hall. This series of books were in the field of software development.

Coad became senior vice president and chief strategist of Borland Software Corp. when Borland bought TogetherSoft in January 2003.  Coad left Borland before the end of 2003 and turned his attention to interests outside of the software development field, especially simplified teaching techniques for learning to read The Bible in its original languages.

Coad is co-founder of TheBible.org, a nonprofit developer of the Parallel Plus® Bible-study app (iOS, Android, web), where he serves as president, 2004–present.

Coad and his spouse, Judy, have been married since 1978.

In 2022, Peter Coad started a new project dedicated to a night-sky photography. Many artworks can be found at closeupphoto.com

Publications 
Books
Java Modeling In Color With UML, Peter Coad, Eric Lefebvre, and Jeff De Luca, June 1999, 
Java Design: Building Better Apps and Applets (2nd Edition), Peter Coad, Mark Mayfield, and Jon Kern, 1998, 
Object Models: Strategies, Patterns, and Applications, (2nd Edition) Peter Coad, Mark Mayfield, and David North, 1996, 
Object-Oriented Programming, Peter Coad and Jill Nicola, 1993, pages 582, 
Object Oriented Design, Peter Coad and Ed Yourdon, 1991, 
Object Oriented Analysis (2nd Edition), Peter Coad and Ed Yourdon, 1990, pages 233, 

Selected Papers
Amplified Learning pdf A practical guide to applying the "seven intelligences" theory, so that your presentations can be more engaging, effective, and fun.

References

External links

TheBible.org website

Living people
1953 births
American computer scientists